Lindmaa is an Estonian language surname meaning "bird land" and may refer to:
Liis Lindmaa (born 1988), actress
Marek Lindmaa (born 1984), sportscaster and television journalist (:et)
Meelis Lindmaa (born 1970), footballer 

Estonian-language surnames